Ritmoteca.com was an online music store. Founded in Miami, Florida, in 1998 during the Dot-com bubble by Ivan Parron, the company was a Latin music download website and an early predecessor to Apple Inc.'s now highly successful iTunes business model of selling digital music downloads over the Internet. Ivan Parron founded the company after operating the web development company Internet Marketing Consultants, which designed Ritmoteca's user interface. Ritmoteca.com aggregated exclusive digital distribution rights from over one hundred independent Latin music record labels and amassed a library of over 500,000 music tracks and videos, including exclusive digital distribution rights to catalogs of Latin artists such as Marc Anthony, Tito Puente and Celia Cruz. The company was signed digital distribution agreements with major record labels, signing agreements with Universal Music Group, Sony Music Entertainment, Bertelsmann Music Group and Warner Music Group. These agreements gave the company digital distribution rights for artists such as U2, Madonna, Britney Spears, Enrique Iglesias and Jay-Z. The company grew to as many as 200 employees through investments from institutional and "angel" investors including Bain Capital. The company was poised to launch an initial public offering when the Dot-com bubble stock market suddenly crashed on April 14, 2000. That event, combined with the emergence of the company Napster on the music scene, enabling people to trade music online for free, made it virtually impossible for the company to raise additional venture capital. The company evolved into a distributor of digital music rights and eventually closed down in 2005.

References

Online music stores of the United States
Defunct digital music services or companies
Defunct companies based in Florida
Defunct mass media companies of the United States
Defunct online companies of the United States
1998 establishments in Florida
2003 disestablishments in Florida
Music retailers of the United States